Melvin Lattany (born August 10, 1959) is a former American track athlete. He was one of the world's dominating sprinters in the early 1980s.

Early years
Lattany attended Glynn Academy, where he was a standout sprinter in track. He also practiced football, where although he was primarily a wide receiver, he also played as a safety, cornerback, punt returner, kickoff returner and was the backup placekicker.

He accepted a track scholarship from the University of Georgia, where he established a new Men's World Junior Record over 100 metres on July 30, 1978.

Lattany qualified for the 1980 US Olympic team as a 100 metres sprinter and a member of the 4 × 400 metres relay team, but was unable to compete due to the 1980 Summer Olympics boycott. He did however receive one of 461 Congressional Gold Medals awarded to those athletes affected by the boycott.

He won a gold medal in the 100 metres at the 1981 Summer Universiade, and in the 200 metres at the 1981 IAAF World Cup, with a 20.21 seconds finish. On May 5, 1984, Lattany became the fifth man (second at sea level) to break the 10-second barrier when he clocked 9.96 seconds in Athens, Georgia.

Professional career
Lattany retired from track in 1985 and signed as a free agent with the Dallas Cowboys of the National Football League on June 20, looking to become an NFL wide receiver as a 25-year-old rookie. At the time, he ran the 40-yard dash in 4.29 seconds. He was released on August 19.

In 1987, he was reinstated by the International Amateur Athletics Federation to run track again.

Accolades and Awards 

In 2009, Lattany was honored as one of the 20 Athletes of the Century at the Drake Relays (he was never beaten in the 100 m, finals and preliminary races, in the four years he competed there, 1978 to 1981; in addition being named outstanding performer in 1981).

In 2013, Lattany was inducted into the Glynn County Sports Hall of Fame.

Rankings

Lattany was ranked among the best in the US and the world in both the 100 and 200 m sprint events from 1979 to 1984, according to the votes of the experts of Track and Field News.

References

External links

1959 births
Living people
People from Brunswick, Georgia
Track and field athletes from Georgia (U.S. state)
American male sprinters
Georgia Bulldogs track and field athletes
University of Georgia alumni
Congressional Gold Medal recipients
Universiade medalists in athletics (track and field)
Universiade gold medalists for the United States
Medalists at the 1981 Summer Universiade